Ronald Reagan (1911–2004) was the president of the United States from 1981 to 1989.

Ronald Reagan or Ron Reagan may also refer to:
Ron Reagan (born 1958), son of the 40th U.S. president
Ron Reagan (Florida politician) (born 1954), member of the Florida House of Representatives
Ronald Reagan Washington National Airport, an airport near Washington, D.C.
USS Ronald Reagan, a nuclear-powered supercarrier

See also

List of things named after Ronald Reagan
Presidency of Ronald Reagan
Reagan (disambiguation)

Reagan, Ronald